The Shawano Post Office is located in Shawano, Wisconsin.

History
The post office was built by the Public Works Administration as part of the New Deal. Its interior features a mural by artist Eugene Higgins entitled 'Early Settlers', completed in 1939.

References

External links

Post office buildings on the National Register of Historic Places in Wisconsin
National Register of Historic Places in Shawano County, Wisconsin
Public Works Administration in Wisconsin
Streamline Moderne architecture in Wisconsin
Vernacular architecture in Wisconsin
Brick buildings and structures
Government buildings completed in 1938